Pai language may refer to:
Pe language or Pai, a minor Plateau language of Nigeria
Pei language or Pai, a Sepik language spoken in Papua-New Guinea
Pai languages, a subgroup of the Yuman–Cochimí language family of North America
Pai language (Bantu), related to Sotho
Bai language (formerly romanized as Pai), a Sino-Tibetan language spoken in Yunnan, China

See also
Pay language